Parliamentary elections were held in Cuba on 1 June 1950. The Partido Auténtico-Democratic Party-Liberal Party alliance won 42 of the 66 seats. It was the last free election held in Cuba on a national level.

Results

References

Cuba
Parliamentary elections in Cuba
1950 in Cuba
June 1950 events in North America
Election and referendum articles with incomplete results